The FIA WTCR Race of Malaysia was a round of the World Touring Car Cup, which was held at the Sepang International Circuit in Malaysia. The race ran as the season finale of the 2019 season.

Winners

References

Malaysia
World Touring Car Cup